The Iranian national basketball team is controlled by the IR Iran Basketball Federation. Overall, the team won three out of the last five FIBA Asia Championship tournaments.

History

The Iranian national team has had limited success on the international stage, with the most international experience being that of their 1948 Summer Olympics qualification, although they did not manage to make it past the group stage.

The team won the Bronze medal at the basketball competition of the 2006 Asian Games in Doha, Qatar.

2007 FIBA Asia Championship
Placed in the dreaded "Group of Death" alongside China, the Philippines, and Jordan, the Iranians won all three group matches to make it to the next round.

In the quarterfinals, Iran went 2–1, to make it to semifinals, following victories over Chinese Taipei and Qatar, and then routed Kazakhstan, 75–62, in the semifinals.

The Iranians then beat Lebanon 74–69, with Hamed Haddadi scoring 31 points. Not only did it avenge an 82–60 defeat in the quarterfinals, they also became the first Western Asian team to win the tournament, and thus make it to the 2008 Beijing Olympics.

2008 Beijing Olympic Games
In being crowned the 2007 Asian Champions, the Iranians qualified for the 2008 Beijing games for the first time in 60 years. The Olympic experience led to a flurry of opportunities for the Iranian players, as they traveled across the world in preparation for the games, including a visit to the US. Iran was placed in Group A, along with Lithuania, Russia, Argentina, Croatia, and Australia, suffering five defeats. The Olympic experience opened doors for players such as Hamed Haddadi, and Iranian captain Samad Nikkhah Bahrami to play in the NBA (National Basketball Association) and sign in the top French League.

Haddadi finished with averages of 16.6 points per game, 11.2 rebounds per game, and 2.6 blocks per game, leading the entire tournament in the latter two categories. His highlight performance was in the game against Argentina when he put up 21 points and 16 rebounds.

2009 FIBA Asia Championship
Winning the FIBA Asia Championship 2009 at Tianjin, China, was a sign on continuing progress in basketball. Iran defeated China, by a score of 70–52 in the final.

2010 FIBA World Championship
Iran's second consecutive FIBA Asia Championship gave them their first ever FIBA World Championship berth, at the 2010 FIBA World Championship.  The team finished 1–4 in Group B, good for 19th place

2013 FIBA Asia Championship

Winning the 2013 FIBA Asia Championship at Manila, Philippines, was a sign that the Iranian team has forgot the tragedy of their loss to Jordan in last tournament, 2011 FIBA Asia Championship, and reclaimed the top place in the FIBA Asia. Iran defeated the charged up hosts Philippines by an 85–71 win in the final. Iranian center Hamed Haddadi, who played a stellar role in Iran's triumph at the 27th FIBA Asia Championship, became the most accomplished individual player of the competition winning two awards, including that of the MVP. Iran was the only team with two awards in the All Stars with Oshin Sahakian named for the Power Forward position.

2014 FIBA World Championship
Iran's third FIBA Asia Championship gave them their second FIBA World Championship berth, at the 2014 FIBA Basketball World Cup.

Tournament records
Red border indicates that the tournament was hosted on home soil. Gold, silver, bronze backgrounds indicates 1st, 2nd and 3rd finishes respectively. Bold text indicates best finish in tournament. B or U18 indicates that the team was represented by its B or U18 team.

Honours
The Iran national team's all-time medal record:

Summer Olympics

World Cup

FIBA Asia Cup

Asian Games

FIBA Asia Challenge

West Asian Championship

Other tournaments
FIBA Diamond Ball
 2008 – 4th place
Islamic Solidarity Games
 2005 – 3rd place
West Asian Games
 1997 – Champions
 2002 – 5th place
William Jones Cup
 2009 – Champions
 2010 – Champions
 2011 – Champions
 2013 – Champions
 2015 – Champions

Team

2020 Olympic roster

Head coaches
Note: The following list may not be complete

  Kazem Rahbari (1948)
  Hossein Soudipour (1966)
  George Chiraleu (1974)
  Mohammad Hassan Zolfaghari (1981)
  Enayatollah Atashi (1983)
  Reza Esmaeili (1985)
  Majid Towfigh (1989)
  Asadollah Kabir (1990)
  Valery Lunichkin (1991)
  Asadollah Kabir (1993)
  Vitali Zastakhov (1994)
  Manouchehr Shahamatnejad (1995)
  Ahmad Reza Elliin (1996)
  Saeid Fathi (1997)
  Enayatollah Atashi (1998)
  Gary LeMoine (2000–2001)
  Saeid Armaghani (2001–2002)
  Mehran Shahintab (2002)
  Nenad Trajković (2003)
  Mostafa Hashemi (2003)
  Vladimir Bošnjak (2004–2005)
  Mohammad Mehdi Izadpanah (2005)
  Fred Oniga (2006)
  Rajko Toroman (2007–2008)
  Veselin Matić (2009–2011)
  Memi Bečirovič (2012–2014)
  Dirk Bauermann (2015–2017)
  Mehran Hatami (2017) 
  Mehran Shahintab (2018–2021) 
  Mostafa Hashemi (2021–2022) 
  Saeed Armaghani (2022–present)

References

External links

 

FIBA profile

 
Men's national basketball teams
1947 establishments in Iran